Martynas Andriukaitis (March 28, 1981 – September 4, 2014) was a Lithuanian professional basketball player. He was born in Kaunas.

Professional career
During his pro club career, Andriukaitis won the Lithuanian League championship (2001), and the Latvian League championship (2007). He was also a league runner-up in the North European League, in 2001. He played at the Lithuanian All-Star Game in 2002 and 2003, and at the Ukrainian League's All-Star Game, and the FIBA EuroChallenge All-Star Day, in 2008.

National team career
Andriukaitis was named the MVP of the 2005 FIBA Stanković Continental Champions' Cup, while he was a member of the senior Lithuanian national basketball team.

Career statistics

EuroLeague

|-
| style="text-align:left;"| 2000–01
| style="text-align:left;"| Zalgiris
| 4 || 1 || 19.0 || .625 || .000 || .917 || 4.0 || .3 || .3 || .5 || 10.3 || 12.0

Death
On September 4, 2014, late in the evening, Andriukaitis shot his wife Renata, in his home near Riga, and shot himself, but he was only severely wounded. Their 14-year-old son witnessed what happened and called the police and paramedics. Andriukaitis was taken to hospital, but died there later that night.

References

External links
 Basketball-Reference.com Profile

1981 births
2014 deaths
2014 suicides
APOEL B.C. players
ASK Riga players
BC Cherkaski Mavpy players
BC Dnipro players
BC Donetsk players
BC Lietkabelis players
BC Politekhnika-Halychyna players
BC Šiauliai players
BC Žalgiris players
BK Liepājas Lauvas players
JA Vichy players
Lithuanian men's basketball players
Murder–suicides in Europe
Power forwards (basketball)
Basketball players from Kaunas
Suicides by firearm in Latvia
Uxoricides